The 2013 Russian Artistic Gymnastics Championships were held in Penza, Russia from March 3–7.

Medal winners

Result

Team Final

All-Around

Vault Final

Uneven Bars Final

Balance Beam Final

Floor Exercise Final

External links
 https://web.archive.org/web/20131029193400/http://www.sportgymrus.ru/contest/archive/8714/default.aspx (Senior)
 https://archive.today/20140522125100/http://www.sportgymrus.ru/contest/archive/9400/default.aspx (Junior)

2013 in gymnastics
2013 in Russian sport
2013
March 2013 sports events in Russia